Miguel Rodriguez Rodriguez, C.Ss.R. (April 18, 1931 – August 31, 2001) was a Roman Catholic bishop.

Rodriguez was ordained to the priesthood in 1958. In 1974, he was appointed bishop of the Roman Catholic Diocese of Arecibo, Puerto Rico and resigned in 1990.

Notes

Episcopal succession

1931 births
2001 deaths
Bishops appointed by Pope Paul VI
People from Mayagüez, Puerto Rico
Redemptorist bishops
20th-century Roman Catholic bishops in Puerto Rico
Roman Catholic bishops of Arecibo